Michelle Scutt (born Probert on 17 June 1960) is a female former British Olympic athlete. Competing for Wales at the 1982 Commonwealth Games in Brisbane, Australia, she won a silver medal in the 400 metres, behind Australia's Raelene Boyle.

Athletics career
Scutt won a bronze medal in the 1980 Summer Olympics in Moscow, running the third leg of the 4 × 400 m relay. She was Welsh champion at 100m (1978–1982), 200m (1978, 1980–1982) and 400m (1979 and 1984). She competed at the 1984 Summer Olympics in Los Angeles in the 400m reaching the semi-final round, and in the 4 × 400 m relay reaching the final and finishing in fourth place. Her personal best time in the 400m was 50.63 which she ran in Cwmbran in 1982, making her the 6th fastest Briton at the distance (as of January 2017). In addition to her silver medal for 400 metres at the 1982 Commonwealth Games she also competed in the 200 metres and 4x400 metres relay.

Personal life
She was engaged to and then married fellow international athlete Steve Scutt in 1980.

References

External links
 
 

1960 births
Living people
Sportspeople from Liverpool
Athletes (track and field) at the 1980 Summer Olympics
Athletes (track and field) at the 1982 Commonwealth Games
Athletes (track and field) at the 1984 Summer Olympics
Welsh female sprinters
British female sprinters
Welsh Olympic medallists
Olympic athletes of Great Britain
Commonwealth Games silver medallists for Wales
Commonwealth Games medallists in athletics
Medalists at the 1980 Summer Olympics
Olympic bronze medallists for Great Britain
Olympic bronze medalists in athletics (track and field)
Olympic female sprinters
Medallists at the 1982 Commonwealth Games